Phatthalung railway station is a railway station located in Khuha Sawan Subdistrict, Phatthalung City, Phatthalung. it is a class 1 railway station, located  from Thon Buri railway station. Phatthalung station opened in January 1913, as part of the Phatthalung-U Taphao Junction (Hat Yai) section of the Southern Line.

2011 Phatthalung rail accident 
On 15 January 2011, freight train No. 722 Bang Sue Junction-Hat Yai Junction, collided with international express No. 36 Butterworth-Bangkok around the Phatthalung station area. Some bogies derailed and collided with local train No. 457 Nakhon Si Thammarat-Phatthalung, which was parked in the sidings. 4 people were injured from this incident, two passengers, one rail conductor and one railway policeman.

The cause was that the locomotive for freight train No. 722 broke down between Phatthalung Station and Pak Khlong Station, so the locomotive for international express No. 35 uncoupled with its carriages (on platform 1) and went to couple with the freight cars of No. 722, to be pulled back to Phatthalung Station. However, as the train approached (to enter platform 2), the rail switch failed and No. 722 collided with the carriages of No. 35 on platform 1. The carriages of No. 35 derailed and collided with carriages of No. 457.

Train services 
 Special Express train (Thaksinarat) No. 31 / 32 Bangkok - Hat Yai - Bangkok
 International Express train No. 35 / 36 Bangkok - Butterworth - Bangkok (Terminated since 2 December 2016)
 Special Express train No. 37/38 Bangkok - Sungai Kolok - Bangkok
 Special Express train No. 45/46 Bangkok - Padang Besar (Malaysia) - Bangkok
 Diesel Rail Special Express train No. 41 / 42 Bangkok - Yala - Bangkok
 Rapid train No. 169 / 170 Bangkok - Yala - Bangkok
 Rapid train No. 171 / 172 Bangkok - Sungai Kolok - Bangkok
 Local train No. 445 / 446 Chumphon - Hat Yai - Chumphon
 Local train No. 447 / 448 Surat Thani - Sungai Kolok - Surat Thani
 Local train No. 451/452 Nakhon Si Thammarat- Sungai Kolok- Nakhon Si Thammarat
 Local train No. 455/456 Nakhon Si Thammarat- Yala -Nakhon Si Thammarat
 Local train No. 457/458 Nakhon Si Thammarat- Phatthalung- Nakhon Si Thammarat (Terminated since 1 October 2015)
 Local train No. 463/464 Phatthalung-Sungai Kolok-Phatthalung

References 
 
 
 
 
 

Phatthalung province
Railway stations in Thailand